The Fortune Teller is an oil painting of circa 1630 by the French artist Georges de La Tour. The work was uncovered in about 1960 and purchased that year by the Metropolitan Museum of Art in New York. François Georges Pariset described the painting in The Metropolitan Museum of Art Bulletin, attributing it to La Tour—a likely choice given the calligraphic signature at top right: "G. de La Tour Fecit Luneuilla Lothar" ("G[eorges] de La Tour made this, Lunéville, Lorraine"). Its authenticity has been questioned in the intervening years, notably by the English art historian Christopher Wright, but The Fortune Teller is generally accepted as La Tour's work. The artist is better known for his chiaroscuro religious compositions, in which the figures are illuminated by a single light source and lack the elaborate costume detail of The Fortune Teller's characters.

The painting catches a moment in which a young man of some wealth is having his fortune told by the old woman at right; she takes the coin from his hand, not only in payment, but as part of the ritual in which she will cross his hand with it. Most or all of the women portrayed are gypsies, and, furthering the stereotype of the time, they are depicted as thieves. As the young man is engrossed in the fortune-telling—an act which, if discovered, would have repercussions for both him and the gypsies—the leftmost woman is stealing the coin purse from his pocket, while her companion in profile has a hand ready to receive the loot. The pale-faced girl on the boy's left is less clearly a gypsy, but is also in on the act as she cuts a medal worn by the boy from its chain. The figures in the painting are close together, as if in a play, and the composition may have been influenced by a theatrical scene.
 
The modern discovery of the painting is said to be traced to a French prisoner of war who viewed La Tour's works in a monograph and found a likeness with a painting hung in a relative's castle. A knowledgeable priest identified it as a La Tour work and informed the Louvre, which entered negotiations to buy the painting. The art dealer Georges Wildenstein outbid the museum, however, purchasing the painting in 1949 for 7.5 million francs. For a decade it remained with the dealer, until in 1960 the Metropolitan Museum of Art paid an undisclosed but "very high sum of money" for The Fortune Teller. How the painting had been able to leave France became a matter of controversy in the French press, and the writer André Malraux, then French Minister of Culture, attempted to explain to the National Assembly why the work did not end up in the Louvre. It later emerged that the export licence was signed by the art historian Germain Bazin, who was head of old master paintings at the Louvre; Wright speculates that he had sufficient doubt about the work not to want it for the Louvre.

Accusations of forgery

 
La Tour was hardly known until the beginning of the 20th century, but became extremely highly regarded from the 1920s onwards. A large number of the paintings now attributed to La Tour have surfaced from obscurity, like the Metropolitan work, since he became well-known, and have become valuable. Many were in collections with a provenance going back to the 19th century or beyond, but others first appeared in the hands of dealers, and some have always been the subject of suspicion. 

The English art historian Christopher Wright published The Art of the Forger in 1984, a book whose central claim is that the Metropolitan Fortune Teller, along with other works attributed to La Tour, is actually a forgery of the 1920s by the artist and restorer Emile Delobre (1873–1956). Wright says that the central girl's dress parodies De la Tour's mother in "The Newborn" (Rennes), suggesting a satire more typical of 20th-century than 17th-century humour. The painting is related to a work called The Cheat, which exists in two different versions: one in the Louvre and one in the Kimbell Art Museum, Fort Worth, Texas. The Cheat shows a group playing cards, where a young dandy is being cheated, and shares the interest in costume of The Fortune Teller. After lengthy analysis of X-ray photographs, details of the costume, and stylistic comparisons with other works, Wright concludes that of the three, only the Fort Worth Cheat is genuine. 

Among his evidence is a claim that the word "MERDE" (French for "shit") could be seen in the lace collar of the young woman second from left. Anthony Blunt and others denied this, but in a letter of 1981 to The Burlington Magazine rebutting Wright's claims, two members of the Metropolitan curatorial staff accepted that the word was there, regarding it as the work of a recent restorer, and it was then removed in 1982. Among those who joined Wright in his concerns were Diana de Marly,  Benedict Nicolson, editor of the Burlington Magazine, and Brian Sewell.

On tour

During the COVID-19 pandemic, the Met began a skylight replacement project that resulted in gallery closures; in response the museum loaned major works from the European collection, including 'The Fortune Teller', to the Queensland Gallery of Modern Art in an exhibition titled ‘European Masterpieces’.

See also
 100 Great Paintings

Notes

References
 Hagan, R.-M., Galbraith, I., & Hagen, R. (1995). What great paintings say: old masters in detail. Köln: Taschen.
 Pariset, Francois Georges (March 1961). "A Newly Discovered La Tour: The Fortune Teller." The Metropolitan Museum of Art Bulletin, New Series. 19(7), 198–205.
Wright, Christopher. The Art of the Forger, 1984, Gordon Fraser, London. 

Paintings in the collection of the Metropolitan Museum of Art
1630 paintings
Paintings by Georges de La Tour